Szczytnicki Park in Wrocław, Poland is located to the east of Plac Grunwaldzki and the old Oder river, and covers approximately 10 square kilometres of land. The park, besides offering many sightseeing attractions, also has many dendrological rarities.

The land under the park was first mentioned in writing in 1204, when Henryk I the Bearded donated the village Stitnic to the monastery of St. Vincent, where shields were produced for the duke's forces. The village was also inhabited by fishermen and farmers. In 1318, the monks sold the village to the city council, becoming the first estate outside the city walls, called Szczytniki.

The forest in Szczytniki was already popular among the inhabitants of Wrocław in the 18th century. In 1783, Frederick Louis, Prince of Hohenlohe-Ingelfingen bought the terrain and established one of the first parks on the European continent in the English style. The park was ruined, however, by French soldiers during a siege of the city.

The park hosts a Japanese Garden (Wrocław), prepared for the World's Fair of 1913, restored by a Japanese foundation, partially destroyed by the 1997 flood and reconstructed. There is also a wooden church from the turn of the 17th century, originally in Stare Koźle.

References

External links
Official page

Parks in Lower Silesian Voivodeship
Tourist attractions in Wrocław